Westmont Historic District is a national historic district located at Westmont in Cambria County, Pennsylvania. The district includes 430 contributing buildings and 2 contributing sites in a predominantly residential area of eastern Westmont. The dwellings are in a variety of late-19th and early-20th-century architectural styles including Colonial Revival, Queen Anne, and Arts and Crafts styles. Notable buildings include the Charles Price House (1891), David Cohoe House, Love House (1912), John C. Ogden House (c. 1919), John Schonhardt House (c. 1919), Frank Buchanan House (1894), Harry S. Endsley House (1895), J. Leonard Replogle House (c. 1912), Elmer E. Stimmel House (c. 1913), F. J. Varner House (c. 1889), Our Mother of Sorrows Catholic Church (1924), and Westmont Presbyterian Church (1926).  The contributing sites are The Mound and Indian Mound or Reservoir Park.

It was listed on the National Register of Historic Places in 1995.

References 

Historic districts on the National Register of Historic Places in Pennsylvania
Colonial Revival architecture in Pennsylvania
Queen Anne architecture in Pennsylvania
Historic districts in Cambria County, Pennsylvania
National Register of Historic Places in Cambria County, Pennsylvania